Ludovico Settala (also known by his Latin name of Ludovicus Septalius; 27 February 1552 – 12 September 1633) was an Italian physician during the Renaissance.

Biography 
Ludovico Settala was born in Milan on February 27, 1552, the son of Francesco Settala and Giulia Ripa. He studied the humanities with Antonio Maria Venosta and philosophy at the Jesuit school in his native city. At the early age of 16 he submitted his graduation thesis. He then enrolled in the University of Pavia where he studied medicine under Paolo Cigalini, a student of Gabriele Falloppio. After obtaining a doctorate in philosophy and medicine in 1573, he began writing on some contradictory passages in Hippocrates and Galen, but this work was interrupted when he was appointed professor of clinical medicine at the University of Pavia. Three years later he resigned his professorship to devote himself entirely to medical practice in Milan. When in 1576 an epidemic of bubonic plague broke out in Milan, Settala played a leading part in fighting the disease and in aiding its victims. He put his experience of the 1576 plague to good use in his treatise De peste et pestiferis affectibus printed in 1622.

He attained to such renown that Philip III of Spain offered him a post as historiographer, and he was tendered professorships at Ingolstadt, Pisa, Bologna, and Padua, all of which honors he refused. From 1605 onward he taught moral and political philosophy in the municipal Scuole Canobiane. In 1627, Settala was nominated by Philip IV to the post of physician-general to the Duchy of Milan. Settala was honored by Alessandro Manzoni in chapter thirty-one of I promessi sposi (The Betrothed, 1827), as “one of the most active and intrepid doctors” during the terrible days of the Great Plague of Milan. During the plague he was himself struck down and subsequently suffered a stroke that left him paralysed on one side of the body. He died in Milan at the age of 81, on September 12, 1633, and was buried in the church of San Nazaro in Brolo.

Settala had established a cabinet of curiosities in his palace on the Via Pantano in Milan. It encompassed the full range of the fine arts and numismatics, a small collection of medicinal plants and related materials, and a comprehensive library of rare books and manuscripts. After his death his son Manfredo took charge of the collection and became one of the great collectors of seventeenth-century Europe.

Works 
A prolific writer, Settala's chief works are Animadversionum et cautionum medicarum libri IX (1614), the result of 40 years of practice, which went through several editions, and De peste et pestiferis adfectibus (1622). He also wrote on moles and nevi (1606) and spoke of the sympathetic relation between the skin of the face and the rest of the body. Settala's 1,200-page commentary on Aristotle's Problemata was one of 1,500 books in the Library of Sir Thomas Browne.

List of works 

 
 
 
 Animaduersionum, & cautionum medicarum libri septem. Quorum materiam sequens pagina indicabit, Mediolani: apud Io. Bapt. Bidell., 1614.
 De peste, & pestiferis affectibus. Libri quinque, Mediolani: apud Ioannem Baptistam Bidellium, 1622.
 Ludouici Septalij patrici et medici Mediolanensis, De ratione instituendae, & gubernandae familiae. Libri quinque. Senator F. edidit, & Iulio Aresio Senatus Mediolanensis principi dicauit, Mediolani: apud Io. Baptistam Bidellium, 1626.
 Della ragion di stato libri sette. Di Lodouico Settala. All'illustrissimo, & eccellentissimo signore Don Emanuelle de Fonseca e Zugniga, Milano: appresso Gio. Battista Bidelli, 1627.
 Cura locale de' tumori pestilentiali, che sono il bubone, l'antrace, o carboncolo, & i furoncoli. Contenente tutto quello, che si ha da fare esteriormente nella cura di questi mali. Tolta dal libro della cura della peste. Del signor profisico Lodouico Settala, Milano: per Giouan Battista Bidelli, 1629.
 Preseruatione dalla peste scritta dal sig. protomedico Lodouico Settala, Brescia: per Bartholomeo Fontana, 1630.
 
 Antidotario romano latino, et volgare tradotto da Hippolito Cesarelli romano. Con l'aggionta dell'elettione de semplici, e prattica delle compositioni. E di due trattati, vno della teriaca romana, ... l'altro della teriaca egittia. Aggiontoui in questa vltima impressione le auertenze, & osseruationi appartenenti alla compositione de medicamenti del sig. Lodovico Settala, Milano: per Gio. Battista Bidelli, 1635.
 Auertenze, et osseruationi appartenenti al curar le ferite, tradotte dall'ottavo libro delle osseruationi del signor Ludouico Settala, da Alessandro Tadino, Milano: per Gio. Pietro Cardi, 1641.
 Breue compendio per curare ogni sorte de tumori esterni, & cutanee turpitudini, raccolto dalle osseruationi fisice, & chirurgice nelli vltimi anni fatte dal sig. Lodouico Settala medico collegiato. D'Alessandro Tadino medico collegiato, Milano: per Lodouico Monza: ad instan. di Altobello Pisani, 1646.
 Ludovici Septalii mediolanensis, Opera de ratione familiae cum instituendae, tum gubernandae libri V et De ratione status libris VII, Editio nova, Ulmae: prostat apud Jo. Frid. Gaum, 1755.

Notes

Bibliography

External links

 
 

1552 births
1633 deaths
16th-century Italian scientists
17th-century Italian scientists
16th-century Latin-language writers
17th-century Latin-language writers
University of Pavia alumni
Academic staff of the University of Pavia
Italian physicians
Plague doctor